The 1991–92 Lancashire Cup was the seventy-ninth occasion on which the completion had been held. St. Helens won the trophy  by beating Rochdale Hornets by the score of 24-14 in the final. The match was played at Wilderspool, Warrington, now in the County Palatine of Chester but (historically in the county of Lancashire). The attendance was 9,269 and receipts were £ ?

Background 

The total entrants remained the same as last season, i.e. at 17.
This necessitated the need for a preliminary round (consisting of just 1 game). The first round (proper) then involved 16 clubs, thus removing the need of  any  “blank” or “dummy” fixtures or any byes.

Competition and results

Preliminary round 
Involved  1 match and 2 clubs

Round 1 
Involved  8 matches (with no byes) and 16 clubs

Round 2 - Quarter-finals 
Involved 4 matches and 8 clubs

Round 3 – Semi-finals  
Involved 2 matches and 4 clubs

Final

Teams and scorers 

Scoring - Try = four points - Goal = two points - Drop goal = one point

The road to success 
This chart excludes the match in the preliminary round

Notes and comments 
1 * The attendance is given as 3,500 in the Widnes official archives - RUGBYLEAGUEproject gives it as 3,499|| 
2 * First Lancashire Cup match by newly named/reformed club and also at this stadium, home at the time of St Helens Town A.F.C.
3 * The first Lancashire Cup match to be played on this ground, one of many used by Fulham during the nomadic period between 1985-1993
4 * The second score of over 100 points (and the second highest score) in the history of the competition when ||St. Helens beat Trafford Borough by 104 to 12. The highest occurred on 14 September 1986 when St. Helens beat Carlisle by 112 to 0
4 * Wilderspool was the home ground of Warrington from 1883 to the end of the 2003 Summer season when they moved into the new purpose built Halliwell Jones Stadium. Wilderspool remained as a sports/Ruugby League ground and is/was used by Woolston Rovers/Warrington Wizards junior club. 
The ground had a final capacity of 9,000 although the record attendance was set in a Challenge cup third round match on 13 March 1948 when 34,304 spectators saw Warrington lose to Wigan 10-13.

See also 
1991–92 Rugby Football League season
Rugby league county cups

References

External links
Saints Heritage Society
1896–97 Northern Rugby Football Union season at wigan.rlfans.com 
Hull&Proud Fixtures & Results 1896/1897
Widnes Vikings - One team, one passion Season In Review - 1896–97
The Northern Union at warringtonwolves.org

RFL Lancashire Cup
Lancashire Cup